Automsoft is a provider of database historian and data visualization software for the process industries.  Founded in 1997, Automsoft has headquarters in Dublin, Ireland and the UK and US.  Automsoft's primary focus is on database scalability based on object database technology and open standards. Currently the company is privately owned, with no external investors.

History 

Founded in 1997, Automsoft sought to address a gap in the market process data historian market by writing a product using object database technology OODBMS.
Automsoft joins the OPC Foundation as a charter member.

2000 Automsoft adds FDA 21 CFR Part 11 compliance to their suite of products.

2001 Automsoft achieves ISO 9001 quality management certification.

2002 Automsoft secures €6 million in funding from IDG Ventures Europe with Pentech Ventures and also wins technical innovation award at Ireland's leading technology event for its RAPID Pharma product for the pharmaceutical market.

2003 Automsoft secures multimillion-pound contract with US biotech giant Genzyme Corporation and ex-Elan Corporation CEO Donal Geaney to chair Automsoft.

2005 Automsoft rapidHistorian software used to find out what happened to oil platform Thunder Horse after Hurricane Dennis hit.

2005 & 2006 Automsoft secures patents on its database technology.

2009 Automsoft showcase their green innovations in clean-tech in Palo Alto California and also achieve OPC Unified Architecture compliance.

2011 Automsoft and Power Analytics announce a partnership to provide solutions for the smart grid environment.

2013 Automsoft chosen as a 2013 Red Herring Top 100 Europe Winner.

References

External links 
 Official website

Companies based in Dublin (city)
Software companies established in 1997